The 	Tekamah Auditorium in Tekamah, Nebraska, was listed on the National Register of Historic Places in 2018.

It was built with New Deal program funding during 1936–38.

References

Auditoriums in the United States
National Register of Historic Places in Burt County, Nebraska
Buildings and structures completed in 1938